Cyperus echinatus is a species of plant in the sedge family. It is native to much of the eastern United States, primarily in the lower Mississippi Valley and the lowland plain east of the southern Appalachians, with scattered populations in Florida and as far north as Wisconsin and the Adirondacks. Additional isolated populations occur in southern Mexico. It is found in a variety of sunny, often mesic habitats.

See also
 List of Cyperus species

References

echinatus
Freshwater plants
Plants described in 1753
Taxa named by Carl Linnaeus